Teresa Ogilvy Dent CBE (born 1959) is the CEO of Game & Wildlife Conservation Trust, a British charitable organisation promoting game and wildlife management as an essential part of nature conservation, since 2001.

Biography
Teresa Dent attended the University of Reading, graduating with a degree in agriculture.

She joined Strutt & Parker as a farming and business management consultant and was a partner at the firm for 13 years. Her next position was with the Game Conservancy Trust (renamed Game & Wildlife Conservation Trust in 2007). She was named CEO of the Trust in 2001. She resides in Salisbury, Wiltshire.

Memberships and affiliations
In 2014 Dent was named to the board of Natural England. She was previously Chairman of the Marlborough Downs Nature Improvement Partnership. She is a board member of the Langholm Moor Demonstration Project.

She is a Fellow of the Royal Agricultural Society of England.

Awards and honors
In June 2015 Dent was named a Commander of the Most Excellent Order of the British Empire (CBE) for "services to wildlife conservation" as part of the 2015 Queen's Birthday Honors.

References

1959 births
Living people
Commanders of the Order of the British Empire
Women chief executives
People from Salisbury